The Matscher Tal (also) is a side valley of the Vinschgau in South Tyrol, Italy. It is part of the municipality of Mals.

References 
Alpenverein South Tyrol 
Pictures

External links

Valleys of South Tyrol